The Lover Speaks is the self-titled debut studio album from British duo The Lover Speaks, released by A&M in 1986.

Background
David Freeman and Joseph Hughes formed The Lover Speaks in 1985, having previously worked together in the punk outfit The Flys. Deriving their name from the Roland Barthes' book A Lover's Discourse: Fragments, the duo began writing material and also recruited keyboard player Barry Gilbert after advertising for a keyboardist. Although Gilbert was not an official member of the group, he would record and tour with the duo. Later in 1985, the band sent a demo tape to Dave Stewart of Eurythmics and soon signed with Stewart's Anxious Music Publishing. Meanwhile, Stewart had forwarded the demo tape to Chrissie Hynde, who sent it to producer Jimmy Iovine. Iovine was successful in getting the band a recording contract with A&M Records in early 1986.

Work on the duo's debut album began in February 1986 at A&M Studios in Los Angeles. The Church Studios in London was also used for recording and Marcus Recording Studios was used to master the album. With Iovine as co-producer, the album took three months to complete. Originally, Freeman had put forward two possible titles for the album – The Politics of Roses and Seriously Purple Prose – but both were rejected by A&M in favour of being self-titled. Describing the album's theme, Freeman recalled in 2015: 

In July 1986, the band's debut single, "No More "I Love You's"", peaked at No. 58 in the UK. In August, the debut album was released, but failed to chart. To promote the album, the band opened for Eurythmics during their Revenge World Tour. A second single from the album, "Tremble Dancing" was released in September, but also failed to chart. A third single, "Every Lover's Sign", was released in October in the UK and November in the US. In December, it reached at No. 6 on the US Billboard Dance Club Songs Chart.

In 1987, the duo followed the album with a cover of Dusty Springfield's "I Close My Eyes and Count to Ten", but the single failed to chart. In June 1987, "Never to Forget You" was released in Australia as a single, with "I Close My Eyes and Count to Ten" as the B-Side. During the same year, the band recorded their second album, The Big Lie, but A&M decided not to release it.

Release
The album was released by A&M Records on vinyl, CD and cassette across the world including in the UK, Europe, US, Canada, Japan and Australia. In June 2015, The Lover Speaks was re-issued on CD by Cherry Pop with eight bonus tracks. The re-issue was produced by Vinny Vero and mastered by Andy Pearce. The liner notes were written by Larry R. Watts with artwork and design by Johan Mauritzson.

As of March, 2022, this critically acclaimed album is not available on iTunes.

Critical reception

Upon release, Billboard listed the album as 'Recommended' in their 'Pop' section. The review stated: "Intricate vocals and splashy arrangements spark this debut, dominated by vocalist/songwriter David Freeman's soul-drenched pop originals." Terry Atkinson of Los Angeles Times stated: "Though its ultra-romantic, stylishly emotional approach sometimes leads to Tears for Fears/Wham! mush, this new English duo bows with a frequently intriguing album. Freeman's hyper-emotional lead vocals are sometimes ludicrously overwrought, but all in all this collection is well worth checking out." He highlighted "No More I Love You's", "Still Faking This Art of Love", "Every Lover's Sign" and "Of Tears" as the best tracks. Cash Box listed the album as one of their "feature picks" during August 1986. They commented: "Led by the interesting and captivating "No More 'I Love You's'," The Lover Speaks debuts with this engaging set."

Kyle Swanson of the Canadian magazine Nerve said: "Exquisitely produced by Jimmy Iovine, The Lover Speaks is disturbingly likeable. It makes no pretense about being pretentious, and all ten tunes are pure love song pop - but state of the art. TLS is David Freeman and Joseph Hughes, who understand this type of music. A vocal hook here, a sweeping melody there, and soon you're humming and smiling and thinking of sunsets. A supremely good make-out record, The Lover Speaks is rare, stellar pop music." Stuart Coupe of The Sydney Morning Herald said: "Discovered by Eurythmics' Dave Stewart, The Lover Speaks display the influences of early Motown, and a production style that has led to comparisons with Phil Spector. Well worth investigating." Music & Media picked the album as one of their "albums of the week" in September 1986.

Frank Gillespie of Number One said: "As far as I'm concerned, this album is just pine-city. Hearts heave as synthesisers are programmed and tears roll down cheeks in the studio as Ultravox's "Vienna" royalties are fondly remembered. The Lover Speaks are a better looking, more believable pair of crooners than Godley and Creme. The production is slinky and smooth and the lyrics have a sad memory from the past to accommodate everyone. Just the stuff for a quiet night in with your nearest and dearest." Colette Campbell of Smash Hits stated: "This lot must be one of the drippiest cry-baby bands ever. Every song on the album is about the trials and tribulations of being "in lurve". The music actually sounds quite nice in a desperately gloomy synthesisery sort of way, so it's a shame they're so overwhelmingly serious and pretentious." Newcastle Evening Chronicle said: "Nothing radically different, just good quality pop-rock performed with verve."

Michael Sutton of AllMusic retrospectively praised the album. He commented on the "stylishly crafted, soulful pop" of "No More "I Love You's"", which he felt was "elevated by Freeman's booming voice". He wrote that "Absent One" and "Love Is: "I Gave You Everything" "surge with bruised emotions", while "Every Lover's Sign" and "Never to Forget You" "offer respite from all the melancholy confessions". He summarised: "...it's the stinging ache in tracks such as "Face Me and Smile," a tale of infidelity, that linger after the album has finished spinning." Imran Khan of PopMatters reviewed the re-issue of the album, where he described the duo's sound as a "baroque and windswept drama of romance and pop". He summarised the album as being "full of bouncy, ebullient grooves and an atmosphere of high drama which still maintains its charm nearly 30 years later".

Track listing
All tracks written and composed by David Freeman and Joseph Hughes except "Of Tears" written by Freeman, Hughes and Barry Gilbert, and "I Close My Eyes and Count to Ten" written by Clive Westlake.

Personnel

The Lover Speaks
 David E.D. Freeman – vocals, producer, arranger
 Joseph Hughes – producer, arranger
with:
 Barry Gilbert – keyboard, arranger (track 10)
Additional personnel
 Nils Lofgren, Steve Lukather, Mike Landau, Robert Farrell – guitar
 Dave A. Stewart – guitar, keyboard
 Roy Bittan – piano
 Charles Judge – synthesizer
 Peter King – saxophone
 Mike Finesilver – bass
 Bobbye Hall, Paulinho da Costa – percussion
 Steve Jordan, Thommy Price – drums
 June Miles-Kingston, Alex Brown, Lynn Davis – backing vocals
Technical
 Jimmy Iovine – producer
 Fred Defaye – engineer
 Marc O'Donoghue – assistant engineer
 Joe Chiccarelli – mixing, recording
 Craig Engel – mix assistant
 Joe Borja – recording
 Robert de la Garza – recording
 John Warwicker – art direction, design
 Matt Mahurin – photography
 Atelier Koninck – typography

Charts

Singles
No More "I Love You's"

Every Lover's Sign

References

1986 debut albums
A&M Records albums
Albums produced by Jimmy Iovine
New wave albums by English artists
Albums recorded at The Church Studios